Albap ("roe rice") is a type of bibimbap made with one or more kinds of roe, most commonly flying fish roe, and served in a sizzling hot ttukbaegi (earthenware) or dolsot (stone pot).

Gallery

See also 
 Hoe-deopbap

References

External links
doosan pedia entry of albap(in korean)

Rice dishes
Roe dishes
Korean cuisine